The oncilla (Leopardus tigrinus), also known as the northern tiger cat, little spotted cat, and tigrillo, is a small spotted cat ranging from Central America to central Brazil. It is listed as Vulnerable on the IUCN Red List, and the population is threatened by deforestation and conversion of habitat to agricultural land.

In 2013, it was proposed to assign the oncilla populations in southern Brazil, Paraguay, and Argentina to a new species: the southern tiger cat (L. guttulus), after it was found that it does not interbreed with the oncilla population in northeastern Brazil.

Characteristics
The oncilla resembles the margay (L. wiedii) and the ocelot (L. pardalis), but it is smaller, with a slender build and narrower muzzle. While this is somewhat longer than the average domestic cat, the oncilla is generally lighter, weighing .

The fur is thick and soft, ranging from light brown to dark ochre, with numerous dark rosettes across the back and flanks. The underside is pale with dark spots and the tail is ringed. The backs of the ears are black with bold white spots. The rosettes are black or brown, open in the center, and irregularly shaped. The legs have medium-sized spots tapering to smaller spots near the paws. This coloration helps the oncilla blend in with the mottled sunlight of the tropical forest understory. The oncilla's jaw is shortened, with fewer teeth, but with well-developed carnassials and canines.

Some melanistic oncillas have been reported from the more heavily forested parts of its range.

Distribution and habitat
The oncilla is distributed from a disjunct population in Costa Rica and Panama, and throughout the  Amazon basin to central Brazil.
In Panama, it was recorded in Darién, and in Volcán Barú National Parks.

Ecology and behavior
The oncilla is a primarily terrestrial animal, but is also an adept climber. Like all cats, the oncilla is an obligate carnivore, requiring meat for survival. This cat eats small mammals, lizards, birds, eggs, invertebrates, and the occasional tree frog. Occasionally, the cat will eat grasses. The oncilla stalks its prey from a distance, and once in range, it pounces to catch and kill the prey.

They are generally nocturnal, but in areas such as Caatinga, where their main food source consists of diurnal lizards, they are more likely to be active during the day. Young oncillas have been observed to purr, while adults are known to make short, gurgling calls when close to one another.

Reproduction
Estrus lasts from three to nine days, with older cats having shorter cycles. Females give birth to one to three kittens after a gestation of 74 to 76 days. The kittens' eyes open after 8 to 17 days, an unusually long period for a cat of this size. Their teeth erupt more or less simultaneously at around 21 days of age. The kittens do not begin to take solid food until they are 38 to 56 days old, but are fully weaned at the age of three months.

Oncillas reach sexual maturity at around two to two and a half years of age. They have a life span of about 11 years in the wild, but there are records of oncillas reaching an age of 17 years.

Taxonomy
The following are the traditionally recognized subspecies:
Leopardus tigrinus tigrinus, eastern Venezuela, Guyana, northeastern Brazil; the nominate subspecies
Leopardus tigrinus guttulus, Atlantic forest central and southern Brazil, Uruguay, Paraguay, northern Argentina (later recognised as a separate species, the southern tigrina)
Leopardus tigrinus oncilla, Central America
Leopardus tigrinus pardinoides, western Venezuela, Colombia, Ecuador, Peru

Although the Central American oncilla is listed as a separate subspecies, based on analysis of mitochondrial DNA, Johnson et al. (1999) found strongly supported differences between L.t. oncilla in Costa Rica and L.t. guttulus in southern Brazil, comparable to differences between different neotropical species. Researchers have argued that there should be a splitting of the oncilla into two species, as there is a pronounced difference in appearance between the oncillas in Costa Rica and those in central and southern Brazil. Further samples of L.t. oncilla are needed from northern South America to determine whether this taxon ranges outside Central America, and whether it should be considered a distinct species rather than a subspecies.

In 2013, genetic research revealed that the former subspecies L. t. guttulus is a separate cryptic species that does not interbreed with the other subspecies, and proposes a classification into two species L. guttulus and L. tigrinus.

A zone of hybridization between the oncilla and the colocolo (Pampas cat) has been found through genetic analyses of specimens from central Brazil.

Results of a morphological analysis of 250 samples of skins and skulls indicate that there are three distinct oncilla groups: namely one in South America's northern, north-western and western range countries, one in eastern and one in southern range countries. Based on these results, the eastern group was proposed to be a distinct species Leopardus emiliae.

Threats

The oncilla is mainly threatened by deforestation and poaching. Oncillas are killed for their pelts, which are highly prized and often sold or made into clothing. Reports in 1972 and 1982 in South America showed that the oncilla is one of the four most heavily hunted of all the small wild cats.

Another factor contributing to oncilla mortality is human expansion and conversion of land for settlements. Coffee plantations are most often established in cloud forest habitats, causing the reduction of preferred habitats.

Hybridization of the oncilla with the Geoffroy's cat (Leopardus geoffroyi) has been found in the southernmost part of its range; hybridization with the Pampas cat (L. colocola) has also been found in central Brazil. Such hybridization may be a natural process, and the extent of this as a threat to the oncilla is unknown.

Conservation
The oncilla has been classified as Vulnerable on the IUCN Red List. It is listed on CITES Appendix I, prohibiting all international commercial trade in oncillas or products made from them. Hunting is still allowed in Ecuador, Guyana, Nicaragua and Peru.

References

External links

 
 Species portrait Leopardus tigrinus; IUCN/SSC Cat Specialist Group

Leopardus
Felids of Central America
Felids of South America
Fauna of the Amazon
Fauna of the Cerrado
Fauna of the Guianas
Mammals of the Andes
Mammals of Argentina
Mammals of Bolivia
Mammals of Brazil
Mammals of Colombia
Mammals of Central America
Mammals of Ecuador
Mammals of French Guiana
Mammals of Guyana
Mammals of Paraguay
Mammals of Peru
Mammals of Suriname
Mammals of Venezuela
Mammals described in 1775
Fauna of the Atlantic Forest